The Whiskeytown–Shasta–Trinity National Recreation Area is a United States National Recreation Area in northern California. The recreation area was authorized in 1965 by the United States Congress. Recreational activities available include swimming, fishing, boating, camping, and hiking.

The Shasta–Trinity National Forest surrounds the Shasta and Trinity units, so they are managed by the United States Forest Service. The National Park Service manages the Whiskeytown unit. 

Each of the units encompasses a large reservoir (man-made lake) and its surrounding natural features, habitats, and terrain.  The WST-NRA has interesting wildlife viewing opportunities, including over sixty pairs of osprey, thirty pairs of nesting bald eagles, other resident and migrating birds, and deer and bear populations.

Plant communities include Riparian, Interior chaparral, Blue oak grasslands, Mixed oak woodlands, and Knobcone pine, Ponderosa pine, or mixed evergreen forests.

Forest Service areas

Of the eighteen National Recreation Areas under Forest Service management in the U.S., the Shasta–Trinity Units are somewhat unusual, being made up of three large reservoir lakes set in scenic and protected foothill locales with diverse recreation opportunities. The Shasta-Trinity National Recreation Area section of the Whiskeytown–Shasta–Trinity National Recreation Area, has  managed by the Shasta–Trinity National Forest. It includes Shasta, Trinity, and Lewiston Lakes and their surrounding natural areas.

Trinity Unit
The Trinity Unit, centered on Trinity Lake and Lewiston Lake, has four subunits: the Lewiston Lake, Trinity Dam, Stuart Fork, and North Lake Units. They offer many opportunities for recreation, including trout fishing in Lewiston Lake, scenic driving on the Trinity Heritage National Scenic Byway, picnicking, camping, and hiking/riding on the multi-use trail system.

The Trinity Dam Unit has Trinity Lake reservoir, that when full has  of shoreline, contains , and holds  of water. Trinity Dam is one of the highest earth filled dams in the world.

Shasta Unit

The Shasta Unit, centered on Shasta Lake, has four tributary arms; Sacramento River, Pit River, Squaw Creek, and McCloud River. Each has distinctive scenic beauty and attracts outdoor recreation visitors. There are numerous facilities for water sports and boating, including private marinas. Public recreation facilities and amenities within the Shasta Unit include boat ramps, campgrounds, shoreline picnic areas, and hiking/equestrian/mountain biking trails.

Shasta Lake is the largest reservoir in California. When full, the lake has  of shoreline, which exceeds that of San Francisco Bay. The reservoir contains , and holds  of water. Shasta Lake is formed by Shasta Dam, which is the second largest (after Grand Coulee Dam) and second tallest (after Hoover Dam) concrete dam in the United States.

National Park Service area

Whiskeytown Unit

It also includes  surrounding the reservoir. The backcountry, with mountain creeks and waterfalls, is accessible via  of multi-use hiking, equestrian, and/or mountain biking) trails.

See also
 Trinity Mountains — in the southern and eastern sections in the recreation area, part of the Klamath Mountains System.
 Marble Mountains — in the northwestern section, are also part of the Klamath Mountains Range.
 Sierra Nevada — in the eastern section.
 Whiskeytown Falls
 Carr Fire

References

External links

 U.S. Forest Service: official Shasta–Trinity National Recreation Area — Shasta, Trinity, and Lewiston Lakes areas.
 U.S. National Park Service: official Whiskeytown National Recreation Area website — Whiskeytown Lake area.
NPS: Discover Whiskeytown’s Biodiversity

National Recreation Areas of the United States
Shasta-Trinity National Forest
National Park Service National Recreation Areas
National Park Service areas in California
Parks in Shasta County, California
Parks in Trinity County, California
Protected areas of the Sierra Nevada (United States)
Klamath Mountains
Trinity Mountains (California)
Sacramento River
Trinity River (California)
Tourist attractions in Shasta County, California
Tourist attractions in Trinity County, California
Protected areas established in 1965
1965 establishments in California